The Torva 15  was a single-seat glider designed and built in the United Kingdom from 1970.

Development 
The Torva 15 was designed as a reasonably priced single-seat glider, with reasonable performance, suitable for club and competition flying. Two versions were designed; one with flaps,  retractable main-wheel and provision for water ballast named Sport, and one with fixed undercarriage covered by a fairing, called Sprite. Construction of the Torva 15 gliders was of glassfibre with foam filling and plywood frames ribs and reinforcement. The specially modified Wortmann aerofoil section endowed the Torva 15's with good climb performance in typical British weak thermals and reduced the stalling speed to allow easy field landings. The smooth lines of the fuselage were unbroken by the one-piece  canopy, which hinged to the side to allow easy access to the comfortable cockpit, with the tail section, integral with the rear fuselage, supporting a cruciform style tail assembly. Large airbrakes in the wings allowed for accurate landings and approach control as well as limiting the maximum speed attainable. The first flight of the Torva 15 Sport, piloted by Chris Riddell, was on 8 May 1971. The Torva company was closed before production could start and the two prototypes were acquired by Chris Riddell.

Variants 
 Torva 15 Sport – The 15m flapped aircraft with retractable undercarriage and provision for water ballast for advanced and competition flying.
 Torva 15 Sprite – The club flying version with no flaps and fixed undercarriage.

Specifications (Torva 15 Sport)

See also

References

 Taylor, J. H. (ed) (1989) Jane's Encyclopedia of Aviation. Studio Editions: London. p. 29
 Coates, Andrew. Jane's World Sailplanes & Motor Gliders new edition. London, Jane's. 1980. 

Glider aircraft
1970s British sailplanes